Thammineni Sitaram is an Indian politician from the YSR Congress Party currently serving as the speaker of the Andhra Pradesh Legislative Assembly from May 2019.

Political career 
Tammineni Sitaram is a graduate in arts and is a senior leader. His political entry started with TDP and was elected as MLA five times from Amudalavalasa and served as minister for three terms, for law and justice, stamps and registrations, excise and municipal administration.

In 2009, Sitaram joined PRP by resigning from TDP in the wake of differences with his close relative K Ravi Kumar. He again joined the TDP in 2012, but he was unable to adjust in the TDP after re-entry. He joined YSRCP in 2013 and contested as MLA from Amudalavalasa constituency in 2014, but was defeated by TDP candidate K Ravi Kumar.

Sitaram belongs to Kalinga community which has dominant vote strength in Srikakulam parliamentary constituency. Sitaram is the fourth Speaker from Srikakulam district. RLN Dora was the first speaker, Tangi Satyam was the second Speaker and K Pratibha Bharati was the third Speaker from Srikakulam district.

Electoral history

References

Living people
1959 births
People from Srikakulam district
YSR Congress Party politicians
Telugu Desam Party politicians
Praja Rajyam Party politicians
Andhra Pradesh MLAs 1983–1985
Andhra Pradesh MLAs 1985–1989
Andhra Pradesh MLAs 1994–1999
Speakers of the Andhra Pradesh Legislative Assembly
Andhra Pradesh MLAs 2019–2024